Léon Arthur Tutundjian (1905, Amasya, Ottoman Empire – December 1968, Paris, France) was an Armenian painter who reached fame in France.

Life 
Leon (Levon) Tutundjian was born in Amasya, in Sivas Vilayet in the Ottoman Empire in 1905. Tutundjian came from a relatively wealthy and educated family-his father and grandfather were teachers. He went to good schools, learned to speak French, and dreamed of moving to Paris. Unfortunately, the family moved often so his father could procure teaching jobs. Tutundjian's life changed dramatically when his father died from cerebral hemorrhage around 1915. Without a primary provider, the family was soon destitute and Tutundjian's mother was forced to sell the family's possessions to care for her children. However, the family did settle down for a time and Tutundjian was able to study at the Berberian and Getronagan schools in Constantinople since his father had taught there.

In 1921-22, Tutundjian's mother placed her son on a boat with other Armenian orphans head to Greece from Constantinople. He was sixteen or seventeen years of age at the time, older than most of the orphans, but the separation from his mother was still difficult for him. According to his daughter, because of the sad memories associated with this parting, Tutundjian always hated to travel, particularly on boats. In 1923, he stayed briefly at the Armenian monastery of the Mekhitarist Brotherhood in the St. Lazzaro island of Venice, Italy, where he studied science and Armenian illuminated manuscripts.

As an Artist 
In 1924, at the age of nineteen, Tutundjian arrived in Paris and studied art at the Ecole des Beaux-Arts. He married a French woman in 1933. He had some close friends who were famed artists such as Yervand Kochar.

Within two years of his arrival in Paris, he exhibited at the opening of the Galerie Surrealiste, and three years later he was the featured artist in a group show at the Galerie des Editions Bonaparte. He created more than a thousand images of several media and styles. In 1930, he co-founded the group Art Concret with well-known abstract artists Theo van Doesburg, Jean Hélion, and Otto G. Carlsund. In 1933, he changed styles abruptly with the figural language of surrealism, which occupied him until 1960, through this long period was interrupted by the events of World War II; first  by his brief military service and then by the years under Vichy rule and the war's aftermath. In his early works, he fought the chaos of his experience by transforming it with a balanced artistic vision into ordered and pure artworks. In 1960 he returned to abstraction until his death in 1968.

Exhibitions 
 1925- “Ney” gallery was his 1st exhibition, which was estimated by the art critics as a 'phenomenon'.
 1926 - Exhibition in the Gallery of Surrealists.
 1929 - Participated in the exhibition 'The Abstract Art'. Along with Joan Miró, Picasso, Piet Mondrian, Jacques Villon and others took part in the exhibition of selected contemporary artists in Amsterdam. Took place the 1st Salon of independent surrealists.
 1931 - Became one of the founders of the 'Abstraction – Creation' group.
 1933 - 1944 International Exhibitions of surrealists.
 1945 - Along with Jean Carzou, Jean Jansem and others took part in the exhibition of Armenian artist in 'Commartin' studio.
 1946 - 1956 was the participant of “Independents” Salon.
 1957 - The retrospective exhibition in Stockholm.
 1958 - Personal exhibition in “Colette Allendy” gallery, where were exhibited his works of 1924-1929.
 1966 - Took place his personal exhibition in Ivon Lambert gallery, Paris.

References

1905 births
1968 deaths
20th-century French painters
20th-century French male artists
French male painters
Armenian painters
People from Amasya
French people of Armenian descent
San Lazzaro degli Armeni alumni
Turkish emigrants to France